Rokytá is a municipality in Mladá Boleslav District in the Central Bohemian Region of the Czech Republic. It has about 300 inhabitants.

Administrative parts
The municipality is made up of villages of Dolní Rokytá and Horní Rokytá.

References

Villages in Mladá Boleslav District